London in Stereo was a print and online magazine offering gig listings, interviews, reviews, and live music listings for London.

Founded in February 2013 they produced a monthly print guide and weekly gig guides. The magazine went on hiatus in 2019 and announced its closure in October 2022

References

External links 
 

Monthly magazines published in the United Kingdom
Local mass media in London
Magazines established in 2013
Online magazines published in the United Kingdom
Listings magazines